Robert Blalack (December 9, 1948 – February 2, 2022) was a Panamanian-born American mass-media visual artist and producer. One of the founders of Industrial Light & Magic, he received the Visual Effects Academy Award for his work on the original Star Wars. He also received the Visual Effects Emmy for his work on the television motion picture The Day After. He produced and directed USA and international mixed-media TV commercials, location-based theme park rides, and his independent, experimental feature films.

Education 
 St. Paul's School, London, England 1963-1966. University Entrance A Levels: Physics, Math, and Chemistry.
 Pomona College, Claremont, California 1966-1970. BA-English Literature/Theater Arts. Begins self-taught work in non-narrative experimental film.
 California Institute of the Arts 1970-1973. MFA-Film Studies. Continues experimental film work, co-directs The Words (1973) with Cal-Arts professor Don Levy. Blalack is the teaching assistant of experimental filmmaker and faculty member Pat O’Neil.

Career

Early experimental films 
 Over/Done (1969) 24 minutes 
 If They Only Knew (1969) 20 minutes 
 Navajo Mountain (1972) 36 minutes 
 The Words (1973) 26 minutes.

Early professional career 
1973: Blalack works the optical printer night shift making 35mm to 16mm TV negatives at Crest Film Labs, later renamed Crest Digital.
 Hearts And Minds (1974).  Academy Award recipient for Best Documentary Feature. Blalack animates director Peter Davis´s smuggled photographs of Con Son Island Tiger Cage prisoners. 
 One By One (1975).  Blalack creates a first-person subjective optical effects sequence designed to put the audience in the driver's seat of a Formula One race car.
During Blalack's work for One By One, Praxis Film Works, Inc. is formed. After One By One, Blalack continues to produce optical effects for low-budget Hollywood movies and optical composite for high-end TV commercials.

In 1975, Blalack works with the two leading Visual Effects innovators, Robert Abel and Douglas Trumbull.  Trumbull commissions Blalack to make a 16mm promo showcasing the creativity of Trumbull's Visual Effects studio “Future General”. While making this documentary, Blalack meets Trumbull's cameraman John Dykstra.

Star Wars (1975-77) 
In June 1975, George Lucas chooses John Dykstra to supervise the Visual Effects for Star Wars. Dykstra asks Blalack to help him build the Star Wars VistaVision Visual Effects facility. As one of the founders of Industrial Light & Magic, Blalack's responsity is to create crucial ILM VistaVision Photographic Optical Composite and Rotoscope Animation production pipelines that will mass-produce a record 365 VistaVision-to-35mm Panavision anamorphic Visual Effects composites.

No modern VistaVision photographic blue screen pipeline exists when ILM is founded. The modest Budget of Star Wars dictates that Blalack gather obsolete VistaVision optical composite equipment, modernize and debug each mechanical and optical component, devise methods to mass-produce 365 Visual Effects composites, design the Rotoscope Department, and hire and train the Optical Composite and Rotoscope crew. Blalack supervises the design and fabrication of the world's first and only aerial-image diffraction-limited VistaVision-to-35mm optical composite system. The Star Wars 365 VistaVision Visual Effects shots contain 1,250 original VistaVision color negative elements, from which are generated more than 10,000 RGB Black & White Color Separations, mattes and other intermediate VistaVision composite elements. All of these VistaVision Visual Effects composite elements are photographed and composited during the final seven months of the Star Wars production.

At the Star Wars 40th anniversary, Blalack spoke to the assembled crew: “All of us changed the direction of filmmaking. Because of you, visions once completely impossible are now within reach. And you know it wasn’t always like that. We discovered that building ILM from scratch during production was like jumping out of a low-budget airplane, and stitching up a parachute during freefall.”

Star Wars Academy Award (1978) 
	Blalack receives the 1978 Best Visual Effects Academy Award for his work on Star Wars.

Cosmos: A Personal Voyage 
In 1980 Blalack produces Visual Effects for 12 of the 13 episodes of Carl Sagan's Cosmos: A Personal Voyage, in collaboration with the series producer Adrian Malone.

The Day After 
In 1983, Blalack designs and produces The Day After visual effects. To determine what Visual Effects the movie needs, the Praxis team creates storyboards designed to visualize the effects on the population of Lawrence, Kansas of the nuclear detonations, the blasts aftermath, radiation effects, and the missile contrails of US-launched ICBMs.

Praxis analyzes the cost of 35mm high-speed blue screen photography of real explosions designed to simulate a nuclear bomb mushroom cloud. Given the number of shots with unique mushroom clouds that must be produced within the modest production budget, Blalack decides to create both the nuclear bomb simulations and the missile contrails of the US-launched ICBMs in a Praxis Film Works, Inc. custom-built, computer-controlled water tank, where the interaction between the iconic mushroom cloud “cap” and “stem”, are each separately controlled with precision.

The Day After Emmy (1984) 
Blalack receives the 1984 Primetime Emmy Award for Outstanding Individual Achievement, Special Visual Effects for his work on The Day After.

Additional motion picture work 
	Blalack creates and produces visual effects for motion pictures, including: 
 Blues Brothers (1980).  Works with director John Landis and producer Robert Weiss to design and produce the visual effects for the “Nazis Drive off the End of the Unfinished Freeway” sequence. 
 Airplane! (1980). Produces the iconic opening sequence of the tail fin of a passenger jet swimming back and forth through clouds, set to the theme music from Jaws. 
 Altered States (1980). Works with director Ken Russell to design and produce special optical effects sequences simulating the psychedelic effects experienced by William Hurt's character. 
 Wolfen (1981). Works with Academy Award winner Michael Wadleigh to design and produce the “Wolf Vision” Special Visual Effects. Wolf Vision incorporates multi-layered RGB color separation optical composites of the Wolfen POV cinematography shot by Steadicam inventor Garret Brown.
 Cat People (1982). Works with director Paul Schrader to design and produce the CatVision of Natasha Kinski's character after she transforms into a black panther.
 RoboCop (1987). Works as Optical Supervisor with director Paul Verhoeven and producer Jon Davison.

Theme park work 
 Seafari (1994). Praxis Film Works, Inc. produces Motion Control Miniature Photography for Rhythm & Hues´s mixed-media theme park ride, with lighting by Visual Effects Oscar winner Alex Funke.
 Aliens: Ride at the Speed of Fright (1996). Praxis Film Works, Inc. provides Motion Control Miniature Photography for this Iwerks Entertainment Location-Based theme park ride, that explores visual themes from the movie Aliens.
 Akbar’s Adventure Tours - Busch Entertainment, Inc. (1998). Blalack directs live action sequences in Marrakech, Morocco and Hollywood, California with Martin Short and Eugene Levy. Praxis Film Works, Inc. produces the visual effects.

Television commercial work 
Blalack has directed hundreds of multi-layered mixed-media USA and International TV commercials, produced by Praxis Film Works, Inc., for such clients as Cadillac, Chevrolet, Coca-Cola, Dodge, Hyundai, Kodak, Minolta, Panasonic, Papermate, Philip Morris, Union Carbide, Sharp, and 3M.

Independent motion pictures 
Blalack was in post production on ”Daddy Dearest”, a Praxis Film Works, Inc. production of Blalack's experimental 8K motion picture scheduled for a 2019 release.

Artworks 
Blalack's “Living Paintings” are 10 hour 4K and 8K UHDTV artworks created from his 2008 to 2017 photographic journeys into the ancient temples of Angkor Wat, China, India, Sri Lanka, and the Gothic churches of France.

Multi-Media conversations 
Blalack has given multi-media talks at more than 70 universities, film schools, VFX schools, art schools and film festivals in China, Germany, Austria, and in France at the Cinematheque Francaise. He explored the design and realization of ILM from scratch for Star Wars, the impact of VFX on Hollywood studio creative choices, strategies for aspiring movie workers to optimize their career paths into and inside today's Merged-Media Motion Picture design and production opportunities.

Personal life and death 
Blalack died from cancer on February 2, 2022, at the age of 73.

References

External links
 

1948 births
2022 deaths 
Deaths from cancer in France
Panamanian emigrants to the United States
Best Visual Effects Academy Award winners
Pomona College alumni
Special effects people
Visual effects artists